Austroderia fulvida, the toetoe, is a species of grass in the family Poaceae, native to New Zealand. As its synonym Cortaderia fulvida it has gained the Royal Horticultural Society's Award of Garden Merit as an ornamental.

References

Danthonioideae
Endemic flora of New Zealand
Grasses of New Zealand
Flora of the North Island
Flora of the South Island
Plants described in 2010